Pitti is an uninhabited islet in the Indian Ocean, 24 km north of Kavaratti, Lakshadweep, India.

Pitti may also refer to:

Pitti (Kalpeni), another small island in Lakshadweep, India which is part of the Kalpeni Atoll
Pitti (Suheli), a long sandbank in Suheli Par, India
Palazzo Pitti, a palace in Florence, Italy
François Pitti-Ferrandi (1838-1894), French doctor and politician
John Pitti, Panamanian football referee
José Luis Rodríguez Pittí, Panamense writer, videoartist and documentary photographer 
Luca Pitti, Florentine banker in the 15th century
Nishant Pitti (born 1986), Indian-born Bollywood movie producer and the co-founder of EaseMyTrip